Note: names are in simplified characters followed by traditional and Pinyin transliteration.

Wu Yun (died 484 BC), better known by his courtesy name Zixu, was a Chinese military general and politician of the Wu kingdom in the Spring and Autumn period (722–481 BC). Since his death, he has evolved into a model of loyalty in Chinese culture. He is the best known historical figure with the Chinese family name "Wu". All branches of the Wu clan claim that he was their "first ancestor".

Classical sources
The historical records of Wu are found in the famous Chinese classics: Records of the Grand Historian (史記; Shǐjì) by Sima Qian, The Art of War by Sun Tzu and The Annals of Lü Buwei. He is also mentioned in Guliang Zhuan and Gongyang Zhuan. The accounts differ, showing the significant influence of folklore on his historical character.

Life

Early life
Wu Zixu was the second son of Wu She, the Grand Tutor of the crown prince Jian of the state of Chu. In 522 BC, Fei Wuji, a corrupt official was sent to Qin to select a bride for the prince. King Ping of Chu received a princess from the state of Qin as a bride for his son, but decided to keep her for himself upon seeing her beauty. Fei Wuji, having gained favour from the King, convinced King Ping that Wu She and the crown prince himself would start a rebellion due to the bride being from Qin, and persuaded the king to execute Wu She. Before his death, Wu She was forced, under duress, to send a letter to his sons, Wu Shang and Wu Zixu, which asked them to join him in the capital. While both realized that this was a trap, Wu Shang decided to go to the capital to die with his father. Wu Zixu, promising revenge, fled to the state of Wu.

Escape

Wu Zixu, along with Prince Jian's son, Prince Sheng, hoped to flee to the state of Wu. Wu Zixu, however, was a wanted man. He and the young prince were constantly pursued by soldiers. King Ping also ordered a very tight controls over the state's borders to catch Wu Zixu. As Wu Zixu approached Zhaoguan, the last pass to the state of Wu, he sought the help of the physician Donggao Gong, who recognized him as Wu She's son. Donggao Gong felt deep sympathy for Wu Zixu's plight and offered to help him escape across the border.

According to legend, Donggao Gong gave refuge to Wu Zixu in his home for a week. Under enormous stress, Wu Zixu's hair turned completely white and his facial features aged greatly. The change was a blessing in disguise as Wu Zixu's changed appearance helped him to escape and head to the state of Wu.

Campaign Against the State of Chu

In the state of Wu, Wu Zixu became a trusted advisor of Prince Guang and helped him assassinate his uncle (or cousin, according to Records of the Grand Historian) King Liao of Wu.  Prince Guang ascended the throne and was known as King Helü of Wu.

In 506 BCE, during the reign of King Zhao of Chu, King Helü decided to invade Chu.  The king personally led the army, along with his younger brother Fugai, Wu Zixu, as well as Sun Tzu, author of The Art of War.  Although Chu had a strong army led by Nang Wa and Shen Yinshu, it suffered a heavy defeat at the Battle of Boju.  King Zhao of Chu fled to Sui and the Wu army captured Ying, Chu's capital.  After entering Ying, Wu Zixu exhumed King Ping's corpse, and gave it 300 lashes to exact vengeance.

The military victory led to Wu Zixu's elevation to Duke of Shen and his alias Shenxu.

Death
Bo Pi, whose grandfather had also been unjustly killed in Chu, arrived in the state of Wu. Despite warnings about Bo Pi's character, Wu Zixu recommended him to the king of Wu, who made Bo Pi a minister.

After the death of King Helü, Wu Zixu did not earn the trust of King Fuchai, the new monarch of Wu. Wu Zixu saw the long-term danger of King Goujian of Yue and advised the king to conquer that state. The King, however, listened instead to Bo Pi, who had been bribed by the Yue state. Concerned with the safety of the kingdom, Wu Zixu pleaded with the king to take action against Yue but was ignored. The King gave Wu Zixu a sword and ordered him to commit suicide on the justification that his behaviour amounted to sabotage. Before he committed suicide, Wu Zixu asked King Fuchai to remove his eyes after his death and hang them on the city gate so that he could watch the capture of the Wu capital by the Yue army.

Ten years after Wu Zixu's death, as Wu Zixu had predicted, King Goujian of Yue conquered the state of Wu. Faced with the demise of his state, King Fuchai committed suicide. He lamented that he did not heed the counsel of Wu Zixu and covered his face as he died because he dared not face Wu in the afterlife.

Legacy 
Wu Zixu is worshipped in eastern China as Taoshen, "God of the Waves". He was also long considered the god of the tidal bore of the Qiantang River near Hangzhou and continues to be worshipped, particularly by Taiwanese Taoists, as one of the five Kings of the Water Immortals. Having assisted King Helü in planning modern Suzhou (then known as "Helü City"), Wu is also sometimes credited as the culture hero responsible for the invention of the waterwheel.

Double Fifth festival
Some Chinese believe that the Dragon Boat Festival (the Double-Fifth festival celebrated on the fifth day of the fifth lunar month)  usually associated with the suicide of the poet Qu Yuan (d. 278 BC) originally commemorated the death of Wu Zixu (484 BC), whose body was thrown into a river after his forced suicide. However, there are caveats. First of all, the practice of venerating Wu Zixu as a water deity can only be traced to the time of the Han Dynasty (202 BC–220 AD). Furthermore, the Wu Zixu water god cult in the Han Era has not directly connected with dragon boat racing (that is to say, the quoted evidence on the Wu Zixu cult fails to mention dragon boat race or even river race), although "close parallels with the boat competition" have been noted by a 6th-century commentary on the festival calendar, according to one scholar. It is documented that sailing boats did carry ritual dancers to appease Zixu's spirit.

Confucian analysis

The parallel lives of Wu Zixu and Qu Yuan have been noted, not just being cast into water, but being "Confucian martyrs", both deaths being the result of acting as scrupled ministers giving his king cautionary advice. While both were propped up by the "Confucian literati", Zixu seems to be the more favored of the two to Confucian minds, though later Qu Yuan later became more popular and supplanted Zixu as water deity.

The story of Wu Zixu is prominent in Sima Qian's Records of the Grand Historian, where it is used as a foil of the author's own choice to accept castration for the sake of a greater goal instead of having chosen honorable suicide.

Arts and monuments
Peking and other Chinese operas include several stories based on Wu Zixu's story, among them Wen Zhaoguan.

A memorial in honor of Wu Zixu was recently built in Suzhou.

See also
Xi Shi
Yao Li
Zhuan Zhu
Wu as a surname
Naval history of China

Explanatory notes

References 
Citations

Bibliography

External links

The Story of Ng Gee Sui
Biography of Wu Zixu, Shiji Vol. 66, in Chinese (Wikisource) 

526 BC births
484 BC deaths
5th-century BC Chinese people
Ancient people who committed suicide
Chinese gods
Chu state people
Deified Chinese people
Suicides in China
Suicides by sharp instrument in China
Wu (state)
Zhou dynasty generals
Zhou dynasty politicians